Thomas George Hutton (born April 20, 1946), is an American former professional baseball infielder-outfielder who played in Major League Baseball (MLB) with the Los Angeles Dodgers, Philadelphia Phillies, Toronto Blue Jays, and Montreal Expos. 

Hutton is currently a color analyst for Miami Marlins baseball television broadcasts on Bally Sports Florida.

Playing career
He appeared in the 1976 and 1977 National League Championship Series (NLCS), with the Phillies. He batted .309 with two home runs and eleven runs batted in (RBI) mostly as a pinch hitter with the Phillies in  before his contract was sold to the Blue Jays at the Winter Meetings on December 8.

Hutton was highly regarded as a standout fielder at first base. He gained considerable notoriety during his Phillies career for his success against Hall of Fame pitcher Tom Seaver of the New York Mets; in 62 plate appearances against Seaver, Hutton batted .320, with 11 walks, three homers and 15 RBI.

Hutton is also notable for never having been hit by pitch during his professional career, in 1,920 plate appearances.

In 952 games over 12 seasons, Hutton posted a .248 batting average (410-for-1655) with 196 runs, 22 home runs and 186 RBI. He was good defensively, recording a .995 fielding percentage playing primarily at first base and at all three outfield positions.

Broadcasting career
After being released by the Expos, Hutton moved from the dugout to the broadcast booth. He worked as a color commentator with ESPN, the Expos (–), New York Yankees (–), Blue Jays (–), and Marlins (–). In , Hutton called Games 1–2 of the American League Division Series between the Seattle Mariners and New York Yankees alongside Gary Thorne for NBC and Game 3 of the ALDS between the Cleveland Indians and Boston Red Sox alongside Steve Zabriskie for ABC.

Owing in great part to an organizational reshuffle, Hutton retired from his 19-season-long broadcasting position with the Marlins following the 2015 season.

Personal

His brother-in-law Dick Ruthven was an MLB pitcher from 1973 to 1986. The two were teammates on the Phillies from 1973 to 1975.

A cousin, Bill Seinsoth, was a star baseball player at the University of Southern California before he was killed in a 1969 automobile accident.

References

External links

Tommy Hutton at SABR (Baseball BioProject)
Tommy Hutton at Baseball Almanac
Tommy Hutton at Baseballbiography.com

1946 births
Living people
Albuquerque Dodgers players
American expatriate baseball players in Canada
Arizona Instructional League Dodgers players
Baseball players from Los Angeles
Los Angeles Dodgers players
Major League Baseball broadcasters
Major League Baseball first basemen
Miami Marlins announcers
Montreal Expos players
Montreal Expos announcers
New York Yankees announcers
Pacific Coast League MVP award winners
Philadelphia Phillies players
Santa Barbara Dodgers players
Spokane Indians players
Toronto Blue Jays announcers
Toronto Blue Jays players